John Glenn (1921–2016) was a United States astronaut and statesman.

John Glen or John Glenn may also refer to:

People 
 John Glenn (judge) (1795–1853), Maryland attorney and federal judge
 John Glen (mayor) (1809–1895), mayor of Atlanta in 1855
 John Glenn (Alberta) (1833–1886), early Alberta settler
 John Thomas Glenn (1845–1899), mayor of Atlanta from 1889 to 1891
 John Glenn (1870s outfielder) (1850–1888), outfielder and first baseman in Major League Baseball from 1871 to 1877
 John Lyles Glenn Jr. (1892–1938), United States federal judge
 John Glenn (1960s outfielder) (born 1928), outfielder in Major League Baseball in 1960.
 John Glen (director) (born 1932), English film director
 John Glen (politician) (born 1974), British politician
 John Glenn (screenwriter) (fl. 1999–2019), American director of The Lazarus Project

Schools 
 John Glenn Middle School of International Studies, a middle school in Indio, California
 John Glenn High School (disambiguation), multiple schools in the United States

Other uses 
 USNS John Glenn (T-ESD-2)
 Fireboat John H. Glenn Jr.
 S.S. John Glenn, an Orbital-ATK Cygnus space capsule used on mission Cygnus CRS OA-7

See also 
 John (disambiguation)
 Glenn (disambiguation)
 John Glen (disambiguation)
 John Glynne (disambiguation)
 Jonathan Glenn (born 1987), Trinidadian soccer player

Glenn, John